The 2010 Chinese Figure Skating Championships were held between September 3 and 5, 2009 in Beijing. Skaters competed in the disciplines of men's singles, ladies' singles, pair skating, and ice dancing.

Results

Men

Ladies

Pairs

Ice dancing

External links
  

Chinese Figure Skating Championships
2009 in figure skating
Chinese Figure Skating Championships, 2010